Joseph Jean-Baptiste Marie Charles Amédée Pichot (3 November 1795 – 12 February 1877) was a French historian and translator.

External links
 
 

1795 births
1877 deaths
19th-century French writers
French medical writers
People from Arles
Translators from English
19th-century French translators
19th-century French male writers
French male non-fiction writers